Raymond Allen (27 October 1908 – 2 August 1979) was a New Zealand cricketer who played first-class cricket for Wellington from 1942 to 1954.

A left-arm spin bowler, Allen took five wickets in an innings in each of Wellington's two matches against Auckland in 1944–45, and was chosen to represent North Island at the end of the season. His best figures were 5 for 58 in his last first-class match, against the touring Fijians in 1953–54.

Playing for Kilbirnie in Wellington club cricket and in minor matches for Wellington in the 1935–36 season he took 100 wickets at an average of 12.37. In February 1944, he ran out the Canterbury batsman John Smith while Smith was backing up; he had previously warned Smith against leaving the crease too soon.

His son Garry played first-class cricket for Wellington in the 1970s.

References

External links
 
 Ray Allen at CricketArchive

1908 births
1979 deaths
New Zealand cricketers
Wellington cricketers
Cricketers from Wellington City
North Island cricketers